George Krause Diehl (February 25, 1918 – August 24, 1986) was a pitcher in Major League Baseball. He played for the Boston Braves.

References

External links

1918 births
1986 deaths
Major League Baseball pitchers
Boston Braves players
Baseball players from Pennsylvania